Wings is a drama series about the Royal Flying Corps that ran on BBC television from 1977 to 1978. It stars Tim Woodward as Alan Farmer, a young blacksmith turned fighter pilot in the First World War. Nicholas Jones played his teacher and mentor, Captain Triggers and Michael Cochrane played his upper-class friend, Charles Gaylion, who began a relationship with Farmer's girlfriend while Farmer was believed dead, shot down over France.

The series reveals that the British pilots are struggling with aeroplanes which are unreliable and inferior to the German machines and with an Establishment that classes voicing an opinion to that effect as being tantamount to cowardice. The airmen must also face the resentment of British soldiers who see them having an "easy" life. The rigidity of the British class structure is highlighted when Farmer becomes an officer in the second series – he faces resentment from some officers because of his class and NCOs because of his new rank. The series takes great care with historical accuracy, covering the early days of the parachute, the fitting of weaponry to British biplanes (lacking the Germans' interruptor gear, they had to be fired at an angle rather than between the propeller blades) and the horrors of trench warfare. Wings depicts a Britain that is, in some areas, struggling to adapt in the face of change, at a period that was a turning point for many people's way of life.

The series was created by Barry Thomas. Twenty-five episodes were made in all.

Effects
The book BBC VFX (Mat Irvine and Mike Tucker) states that few First World War aircraft were still airworthy at the time of production so the majority of flying shots were achieved with 1/6 scale radio-controlled models under the guidance of long-time model aircraft expert David Boddington alongside Derek Piggott and Tony Bianchi. Piggott served as a stunt pilot during the filming of the 1966 movie The Blue Max.

Cast
 Nicholas Jones as Captain Owen Triggers
 Tim Woodward as 2nd Lieutenant Alan Farmer
 Michael Cochrane as 2nd Lieutenant Charles Gaylion
 David Troughton as Lieutenant Richard Bravington
 Sarah Porter as Lorna Collins
 Roger Elliott as Sergeant Mills
 Anne Kristen as Molly Farmer
 John Hallam as Harry Farmer
 Reg Lye as Tom
 Michael Jayes as 2nd Lieutenant Michael Starling
 Graham Wyles as Roger Pearson
 Celia Bannerman as Kate Gaylion (series 1)
 Julia Carey as Kate Gaylion (series 2) 

Actors who played small parts in the series and later became well known in bigger roles included Anthony Andrews, Simon Cadell, Jane Lapotaire and Tim Pigott-Smith.

Episodes
Series 1 consisted of 12 episodes. Series 2 consisted of 13 episodes.

Series 1 (1977)

Series 2 (1978)

Broadcast
The first series was screened on BBC1 on Sundays from 2 January 1977 to 20 March 1977. The second series was shown on BBC1 on Thursdays from 5 January 1978 to 30 March 1978.

References

External links
 
 
 Wings at the British Film Institute (BFI)

BBC television dramas
World War I television drama series
1970s British drama television series
1977 British television series debuts
1978 British television series endings
Aviation television series
English-language television shows